The 1907 Penn State Nittany Lions football team was an American football team that represented Pennsylvania State College—now known as Pennsylvania State University–as an independent during the 1907 college football season. The team was coached by Tom Fennell and played its home games on Beaver Field in State College, Pennsylvania. This was the first year that Penn State had adopted the Nittany Lion as its official mascot.

Schedule

References

Penn State
Penn State Nittany Lions football seasons
Penn State Nittany Lions football